For acetylcholinesterase (AChE), quasi-irreversible inhibitors are those that rapidly phosphorylate AChE. A subsequent internal dealkylation reaction may then occur, which, according to X-ray crystallography data, is suggestive of covalent bond formation. The newly formed OP-enzyme conjugate is as a result permanently deactivated.

Historically, irreversible acetylcholinesterase inhibitors have been used as insecticides and chemical weapons.

See also
Reversible inhibitors
Monoamine oxidase inhibitors
Enzyme inhibitor

References

Enzyme inhibitors